G 2/10 is a decision issued on 30 August 2011 by the Enlarged Board of Appeal of the European Patent Office (EPO) on the subject of disclosed disclaimers. It lies from decision T 1068/07 by Technical Board of Appeal 3.3.08, who referred a question to the Enlarged Board.

The referred question was: 

In its answer to the referred question, the Enlarged Board of Appeal ruled that "an amendment to a claim by the introduction of a disclaimer disclaiming from it subject-matter disclosed in the application as filed infringes  if the subject-matter remaining in the claim after the introduction of the disclaimer is not, be it explicitly or implicitly, directly and unambiguously disclosed to the skilled person using common general knowledge, in the application as filed." The Enlarged Board of Appeal also ruled that "Determining whether or not that is the case requires a technical assessment of the overall technical circumstances of the individual case under consideration, taking into account the nature and extent of the disclosure in the application as filed, the nature and extent of the disclaimed subject-matter and its relationship with the subject-matter remaining in the claim after the amendment."

References

Further reading 
: "Principles established in G 2/10 for disclosed disclaimers"

External links 
 Decision G 2/10, Official Journal EPO 6/2012, 376

G 2010 2
2011 in case law
2011 in Europe